Marian Scott may refer to:
 Marian Dale Scott, Canadian painter
 Marian Scott (statistician), Scottish statistician, author and academic
 Marian Montagu Douglas Scott, paternal grandmother of Sarah, Duchess of York

See also
 Marion Scott (disambiguation)